Marcel Desailly (born Odenke Abbey; 7 September 1968) is a French former professional footballer, widely considered to be among the greatest centre-backs and defensive midfielders to ever play football. During a successful career at club level, lasting from 1986 to 2006, Desailly won several titles, including UEFA Champions League medals with both Marseille and AC Milan, and also played for Nantes and Chelsea, among other teams. At international level, he collected 116 caps between 1993 and 2004, scoring three goals, and was a member of the France international squads that won the 1998 World Cup and Euro 2000.

Club career
Marcel Desailly was born as Odenke Abbey on 7 September 1968 in Accra, Ghana, the son of Ghanaian parents. He had his name changed when his mother married the head of the French Consulate in Accra, who adopted all of her children (the former professional footballer Seth Adonkor, seven years his elder, was a half-brother of his). The family relocated to France when Desailly was four years old. Following Adonkor's lead, he began his career at FC Nantes. There, as part of the famed FC Nantes youth programme, he played alongside a young Didier Deschamps, who became his closest friend. Desailly turned professional in 1986, two years after his half-brother had died in a car accident. In 1992, he moved to Olympique de Marseille, where he reunited with Deschamps, and won the UEFA Champions League the following year. In 1994, while playing for AC Milan, he again won the Cup (scoring in the final himself), being the first player to win the Cup in consecutive seasons with different clubs. During his time in Milan he won two Italian league titles, in 1994 and 1996. Although he preferred to be deployed as a sweeper or centre-back, roles which he played during his time in France, he found much success playing as a defensive midfielder for Milan, alongside Demetrio Albertini, due to the presence of several other established centre-backs at the club, such as Franco Baresi, Alessandro Costacurta and Filippo Galli.

Desailly then moved to the English club Chelsea in 1998 for £4.6 million, where he captained the side and played sweeper and centre-back until the end of the 2003–04 season. It was at Chelsea that Desailly formed a formidable partnership with Frank Leboeuf.

He picked up one major trophy in his six seasons with Chelsea, being on the winning side in their FA Cup triumph over Aston Villa in 2000.

Desailly was snapped up by Qatari outfit Al-Gharafa in 2004. He was appointed as the club captain and under the French coach Bruno Metsu they won the Qatar League in 2005. He then joined Qatar S.C., leading them to second place in the league before retiring from professional football.

In 2014, Desailly had met the Football Association of Malaysia and said he was ready and willing to coach the Malaysia national team. He also pointed that it was up to the football association whether to hire him or not.

International career

Desailly has often said that he feels totally French and while having ties with Ghana, never even considered playing for a country other than France.  During an interview in Ghana, he stated that he did not have much choice about which country to play for as he was already established in the French national youth football team. This stance was restated in his autobiography, published in 2002. He made his international debut in 1993, but was not established as a first choice defender until 1996.

He was an important part of the French team which won the 1998 FIFA World Cup, albeit being sent off in the final match. Like other team members, he was appointed a Knight of the Legion of Honour in 1998.

Two years later success continued, as France won Euro 2000. After the tournament, Desailly was made captain of the national team, following the retirement of Didier Deschamps. In 2001, he led France to victory in the Confederations Cup.

In April 2003, Desailly surpassed the record for the number of appearances for the French team, a number which eventually reached 116 when he announced his retirement from international football following 2004 UEFA European Football Championship. However, that record was broken during the 2006 FIFA World Cup by Lilian Thuram.

Style of play
Nicknamed "The Rock", due to his consistency, strength, and hard-tackling playing style, Desailly is considered one of the most accomplished players of his generation, and one of the finest French defenders ever, who stood out for his charismatic leadership and ability to organise his team's back-line and break down opposition plays throughout his career. A quick, hard-working, tenacious, and powerful player, who excelled in the air and at anticipating his opponents, he combined his aggression, stamina, and ability to read the game, as well as his physical, mental, and defensive skills, with a notable confidence and good technique on the ball, which also allowed him to play in midfield throughout his career; indeed, after moving to Milan, although he initially started out playing as a centre-back or sweeper, and occasionally even as a full-back, he was later deployed as a defensive midfielder, a position in which he also excelled, successfully filling the void left by the departure of Frank Rijkaard due his ball-winning abilities and capacity to start attacking plays after winning back possession. In addition to his defensive skills, he was also capable of contributing to his team's offensive plays with goals by making attacking runs into the box. In 2004, he was named by Pelé in the FIFA 100 as one of the world's greatest living players.

Legacy
Marcel Desailly is currently residing in Ghana. He is currently a Laureus Academy member and OrphanAid Africa Lifetime ambassador to Ghana and France (since 2005). He was mentioned as a possible candidate for the coaching position of the Ghana national team. He has since then pulled out of the race to coach the Ghana National Team, although the option is likely to keep coming up. He has opened (June 2011) a sports facility in Ghana called Lizzy Sports Complex, in memory of his late mother, geared to young players and children in particular. Many African National teams use the centre to camp and prepare for international tournaments.

Post-playing career

Desailly's autobiography, Capitaine, was published in France by Stock in 2002.

Media work
Following retirement, Desailly became a pundit for BBC Sport predominantly giving his opinion from the touchline at both half time and full-time as opposed to residing in the studio with Alan Hansen, Alan Shearer and Martin O'Neill.

He worked for BBC Sport in the United Kingdom during the 2006 World Cup, as one of their Match of the Day analysts.

He also worked for BBC Sport at the 2008 Africa Cup of Nations and Euro 2008 and is a regular commentator for French television channel Canal Plus.

He also became a spokesperson for sports betting website Betclic.

In 2010 Desailly joined the ITV Sport team for their World Cup coverage from South Africa.

Charity work
Desailly is a supporter of the 1GOAL Education for All campaign. He is also the UNICEF national Goodwill Ambassador for Ghana. He is the Lifetime Goodwill Ambassador for his personal Charity OrphanAid Africa, that helps abandoned children in Ghana. He is a member of the Laureus Sports for Good Foundation.

Licensed merchandise
A mobile video game entitled Marcel Desailly Pro Soccer, developed by Gameloft was released for mobile phones in 2003. Desailly is an ICON in FIFA 21 Ultimate Team and FIFA 22 Ultimate Team with ratings of 87 (base), 88 (mid), 91 (prime), and 92 (Prime Icon Moments)in both games.

Personal life
Desailly is a member of the Ga ethnic group. He is married to Virginie and has four children. His nephew James Édouard Adams is a semi-professional footballer.

Career statistics

Club

International

Scores and results list France's goal tally first, score column indicates score after each Desailly goal

Honours
Marseille
UEFA Champions League: 1992–93

AC Milan
Serie A: 1993–94, 1995–96
Supercoppa Italiana: 1994
UEFA Champions League: 1993–94
European Super Cup: 1994

Chelsea
FA Cup: 1999–2000
FA Charity Shield: 2000
UEFA Super Cup: 1998

Al-Gharafa
Qatar Stars League: 2004–05

France
FIFA World Cup: 1998
UEFA European Championship: 2000
FIFA Confederations Cup: 2001, 2003

Individual
Overseas Team of the Decade – Premier League 10 Seasons Awards (1992/93 – 2001/02)
Overall Team of the Decade – Premier League 10 Seasons Awards (1992/93 – 2001/02)
UEFA Euro 1996 Team of the Tournament
FIFA XI: 1996
1998 FIFA World Cup All-Star Team
UEFA Euro 2000 Team of the Tournament
FIFA 100: 2004
Trophée d'honneur UNFP: 2005
AC Milan Hall of Fame
Golden Foot Legends Award: 2017

Orders
Knight of the Legion of Honour: 1998

See also
List of men's footballers with 100 or more international caps

References

External links

Chelsea legend profile

1968 births
Living people
Ga-Adangbe people
A.C. Milan players
Chevaliers of the Légion d'honneur
Chelsea F.C. players
FC Nantes players
FIFA Century Club
FIFA 100
Association football midfielders
Association football defenders
France international footballers
French adoptees
Ghanaian emigrants to France
French expatriate sportspeople in England
French expatriate sportspeople in Italy
French expatriate sportspeople in Qatar
French expatriate footballers
Expatriate footballers in England
Expatriate footballers in Italy
Expatriate footballers in Qatar
French footballers
Ghanaian footballers
Olympique de Marseille players
Footballers from Accra
Ligue 1 players
Premier League players
Serie A players
UEFA Euro 1996 players
1998 FIFA World Cup players
Al-Gharafa SC players
UEFA Euro 2000 players
2001 FIFA Confederations Cup players
2002 FIFA World Cup players
2003 FIFA Confederations Cup players
UEFA Euro 2004 players
FIFA World Cup-winning players
FIFA Confederations Cup-winning players
UEFA European Championship-winning players
Qatar SC players
Qatar Stars League players
UEFA Champions League winning players
Black French sportspeople
Footballers from Nantes
FA Cup Final players